Dave Cooper (b. 1967 in Nova Scotia, Canada) is a Canadian cartoonist, oil painter, and animator. 

Cooper was born in Nova Scotia in 1967 and moved to Ottawa, Ontario at the age of nine.

Cooper began his career in the 90s, making underground comics for Seattle's Fantagraphics Books. His periodical Weasel won both the underground Ignatz Award and the Harvey Award in 2000. His psycho-erotic graphic novel Ripple sported an introduction by David Cronenberg.

At the turn of the century, Cooper morphed into an oil painter, showing alternately at galleries in Los Angeles and New York City. He also had a large retrospective of his comicbook artwork in Angouleme and Paris in 2002. Monographs of his paintings included introductions by comedian David Cross, and filmmaker Guillermo del Toro.

Around 2008 Cooper turned his attention to the field of animation, ultimately getting two of his original kids TV shows greenlit — Pig Goat Banana Cricket for Nickelodeon and The Bagel and Becky Show for Teletoon/BBC. His short adult film, The Absence of Eddy Table was released in the fall of 2016 and has since won a number of awards internationally.

In the summer of 2017 Cooper returned to oil painting, embarking on ambitious new works for his largest gallery show to date — 70 paintings for Paris 2020. Concurrently, he completed his largest single commission for a Madrid museum—a 13'-wide nod to Bosch's The Garden of Earthly Delights.

In 2019, a French publisher will release a 300-page English/French retrospective of Cooper's work, Pillowy, the Art of Dave Cooper. Also in 2019, Cooper joined the board of directors of Ottawa's cutting-edge artist-run centre Saw Gallery.

Cooper lives in Ottawa, Canada.

Selected works
 Suckle (1997) 
 Weasel #1–5
 Crumple (2000) 
 Dan and Larry (2002) 
 Ripple (2003) 
 Overbite (Weasel 6) (2003) 
 Underbelly (Weasel 7) (2005) 
 Bagel's Lucky Hat (as Hector Mumbly, 2007) 
 Bent (2010) 
Ripple deluxe re-release (2017)  
Mudbite (2018)

Awards
 Harvey Award, Best New Series, 2000 — Weasel
 Ignatz Award, Outstanding Artist, 2000 — Weasel
Best Design, Ottawa International Animation Festival, 2016 –  "dave cooper's The Absence of Eddy Table"
Audience Award, Fredrikstad Animation Festival, 2016 –  "dave cooper's The Absence of Eddy Table" 
Grand Prix, Fredrikstad Animation Festival, 2016 –  "dave cooper's The Absence of Eddy Table"
Special Mention, Art Direction, Spark Animation Festival, 2016 –  "dave cooper's The Absence of Eddy Table"
Grand Prix, 2017 Festival BD6Né-  "dave cooper's The Absence of Eddy Table"
Best Animated Short, 2017 Guanajuato International Film Festival-  "dave cooper's The Absence of Eddy Table"
Best Animated Short, 2017 FEFFS Strasbourg European Fantastic Film Festival- "dave cooper's The Absence of Eddy Table"

References

External links
 
 Dave Cooper on Fantagraphics Books
davegraphicsyeah.wordpress.com
instagram.com/davecooper67/?hl=en
 

Alternative cartoonists
Artists from Ottawa
Artists from Nova Scotia
Living people
Showrunners
1957 births
Ignatz Award winners for Outstanding Artist
Canadian animators
Canadian cartoonists
Canadian graphic novelists